Samantha Judge (born 22 March 1978) is a female field hockey forward from Scotland. She has made 199 appearances for the Women's National Team. She is the current coach at Edinburgh University Hockey Club.

Judge was born in Paisley and attended Hutchesons' Grammar School. She also played badminton for Scotland at U16 level. She graduated with a degree in sports science from the University of Edinburgh.

Judge played club hockey for Glasgow Western and made her debut for the Women's National Team in 1999. She played in three consecutive Commonwealth Games tournaments: Manchester, Melbourne and Dehli. Despite having been a cornerstone of Scotland's attack over several years, Judge wasn't selected for the squad ahead of the 2014 Games in Glasgow.

Judge is the director of hockey at George Watson's college and head of performance for Women's hockey at the university of Edinburgh .

References

External links
 Profile on Scottish Hockey

1978 births
Living people
Scottish female field hockey players
Scottish female badminton players
Field hockey players at the 2002 Commonwealth Games
Field hockey players at the 2006 Commonwealth Games
Sportspeople from Paisley, Renfrewshire
Alumni of the University of Edinburgh
Commonwealth Games competitors for Scotland